Indonesia is competing at the 2022 Asian Track Cycling Championships in New Delhi, India from 18 June to 22 June.

Medalists

Sprint

1 km Time Trial

500 m Time Trial

Keirin 

Qualification legend: FA=Gold medal final; FB=Bronze medal final

Individual pursuit

Points Race

Scratch

Omnium

Madison

References 

Asian Track Cycling Championships